William Grady Little (born March 3, 1950) is a former manager in Major League Baseball, currently working in the front office of the Pittsburgh Pirates. He managed the Boston Red Sox from 2002 to 2003 and the Los Angeles Dodgers from 2006 to 2007. He was inducted into the Kinston, North Carolina, Professional Baseball Hall of Fame in 2001, Charlotte Baseball Hall of Fame 1985 and was inducted into the Hagerstown Suns Hall of Fame on April 13, 2009.

In his second season with the Red Sox, Little guided the team to a record of 95–67 and an appearance in the 2003 American League Championship Series against the New York Yankees. Despite his accomplishments, Little is best remembered for his decision to leave starting pitcher Pedro Martínez in the eighth inning of Game 7 while the Red Sox held a three-run lead, and faced blame for the team's subsequent loss when the Yankees were able to tie the score and win in extra innings.

Playing career
He graduated from Garinger High School in Charlotte, North Carolina, before he was selected by the Atlanta Braves in the 12th round of the 1968 MLB Draft.

After spending the 1969 season in the Marine reserves, Grady played in 167 games as a catcher over five minor-league seasons in the Braves and New York Yankees organizations. He posted a career .207 batting average with two home runs and 37 runs batted in. He retired from playing in 1973.

Coaching career
From 1996 to 2001, Little served as a coach for the Padres, Red Sox, and Indians.

High school
Grady Little was working in the front office of the Pittsburgh Pirates and spent time as the Head of Baseball Operations as well as Head Coach for the Varsity Baseball team at Hickory Grove Christian School in Charlotte, NC. Now he is retired and living the rest of his life with his wife right where he grew up.

Minor leagues
Little became a player–coach for the West Haven Yankees while still playing in 1971 and continued through his retirement as a player, remaining as a coach with West Haven until 1974.

During the 1975–79 seasons he stayed away from baseball and worked as a cotton farmer.

He managed in the minor leagues for 16 years, compiling a record of 1,054–903 (.539).

The minor league teams he managed:
1980: Bluefield Orioles
1981–82,84: Hagerstown Suns - league champs in 1981
1983–84: Charlotte O's
1985: Kinston Blue Jays
1986–87: Pulaski Braves – league champs in 1986
1988: Burlington Braves
1988–1991: Durham Bulls
1992: Greenville Braves – League Champs, won minor league manager of the year
1992: Grand Canyon Rafters- In Arizona Fall League, inducted into AzFL's Hall of fame in 2006.
1993–1995: Richmond Braves – League Champs & International League Manager of the Year in 1994

While manager of the Durham Bulls, Little served as Baseball Trainer for the movie Bull Durham.

Managing career

Boston Red Sox (2002–2003)
In March 2002, the Boston Red Sox hired Little as their manager. Little was enormously popular with his players as he enhanced the loose nature of the clubhouse and supported struggling players. His tenure was successful, as the Red Sox won a combined 188 games in his two seasons and nearly took the pennant in 2003.

However, the 2003 season (and Little's entire tenure with the Red Sox) is mostly remembered for his controversial decision during Game 7 of the 2003 American League Championship Series against the New York Yankees. The Red Sox led the game 5–2 in the 8th inning, and were five outs away from reaching the World Series. Little visited the mound after starting pitcher Pedro Martínez gave up three straight hits, and a run from Derek Jeter, but he decided against taking out the ace pitcher, who had thrown 118 pitches to that point. The Yankees tied the game the next at-bat when Jorge Posada hit a two-run bloop single, and went on to win the game (and the pennant) in the 11th inning off of a home run by Aaron Boone.

Little was the target of great angst in the aftermath of the Red Sox' loss (which turned out to be the final manifestation of the so-called Curse of the Bambino). Critics pointed out that Martinez' ERA almost tripled when his pitch count exceeded 100, and the Red Sox had three well-rested relief pitchers (Alan Embree, Mike Timlin, and Scott Williamson) in the bullpen waiting to take over in the eighth inning with a three-run lead. In fact, the strong performance of the bullpen in relief of Martinez that day would seem to suggest that Little's decision was ultimately responsible for the Game 7 ALCS result. Supporters responded that Little's decision to trust Martinez was in keeping with his intuitive style that had brought the Red Sox that far in the first place. Nevertheless, the Red Sox front office decided a change was needed and declined to renew Little's contract.

In his post mortem of Little's ouster, sportswriter Rob Neyer argued that Little had ignored reams of data that showed Martinez was not the same pitcher after 105-110 pitches. As Neyer put it, Little "didn't make the decision he'd been told to make" by Red Sox management.

He was replaced by Terry Francona, who would go on to manage the club from 2004 to 2011 and lead them to World Series titles in 2004 and 2007.

When Little's contract was not renewed by the Red Sox, the independent minor league Brockton Rox announced plans to give away Grady Little bobble arm dolls to the first 1,000 fans to attend the May 29, 2004 game. The doll's arm bounces to simulate a manager's call to the bullpen, displays the date October 16, 2003 (the date of Game 7 of the ALCS) and Little's win total from the 2002 and 2003 seasons. The plans were canceled when Little objected to his likeness being used. In an agreement with the Rox, Little permitted the dolls to be sold with the provision that the money raised from the sale would go "to the Professional Baseball Scouting Foundation, which provides relief to retired scouts in financial peril". The initial selling price was $38.36 (two times $19.18, 1918 being the last time the Red Sox won the World Series) but later auctions of autographed versions sold for as high as $255.

Los Angeles Dodgers (2006–2007)
Little spent 2004 and 2005 as a consultant, instructor, and scout with the Chicago Cubs. On December 8, 2005, after an organizational shakeup that resulted in the dismissal of both manager Jim Tracy and general manager Paul DePodesta, the Los Angeles Dodgers turned to Little to be the team's seventh manager since its 1958 move to Los Angeles. As manager of the Dodgers, Little was reunited with several players from the 2002–2003 Boston Red Sox teams, including pitcher Derek Lowe, third baseman Bill Mueller, and shortstop-turned-first baseman Nomar Garciaparra. Little and new general manager Ned Colletti were widely credited for bringing a fresh outlook to a team that had been wracked by instability over the previous decade. The Dodgers won 88 games in 2006 and earned the NL wild-card spot in the playoffs during Little's first season; however, they were swept by the New York Mets in the NLDS. Plagued by injuries to several key players and fielding a lineup loaded with youngsters, the Dodgers failed to reach the playoffs in 2007.

Dodgers general manager Ned Colletti initially confirmed that Little would return as manager of the ballclub in 2008. However, Little appeared hesitant to do so after Colletti partly blamed him and his staff for the Dodgers' disappointing 2007 season. Little failed to contact Colletti for over two weeks. This resulted in Colletti entering into a tentative agreement with Joe Girardi, and when it fell through, negotiations with Joe Torre. Citing personal reasons, Little subsequently resigned on October 30, 2007.

Front-office career

Pittsburgh Pirates (2014–present)
On December 8, 2014, Little joined the Pittsburgh Pirates as a senior advisor to the team's front office.

Managerial record

Family
Little with his wife, Debi, have a son, Eric, and three grandchildren (Braden, Luke, and Jace). His brother Bryan Little is a former major league infielder.

References

External links

Baseball-Reference.com – Major League managerial record
Minor league managerial record

1950 births
Living people
Baseball catchers
Boston Red Sox coaches
Boston Red Sox managers
Cleveland Indians coaches
Durham Bulls managers
Fort Lauderdale Yankees players
Greenwood Braves players
Los Angeles Dodgers managers
Magic Valley Cowboys players
Major League Baseball bench coaches
Major League Baseball bullpen coaches
Pittsburgh Pirates scouts
Pittsburgh Pirates executives
Chicago Cubs scouts
San Diego Padres coaches
Sportspeople from Abilene, Texas
West Haven Yankees players
Baseball coaches from North Carolina